John Keith Patrick Allen (17 March 1927 – 28 July 2006) was a British actor.

Life and career
Allen was born in Nyasaland (now Malawi), where his father was a tobacco farmer. After his parents returned to Britain, he was evacuated to Canada during the Second World War where he remained to finish his education at McGill University in Montreal. He gained experience as a local radio broadcaster and appeared on television in plays and documentaries, before returning to Britain.

Returning to the UK in 1953, Allen made his film debut in Alfred Hitchcock's Dial M for Murder (1954). He subsequently appeared in character roles in many films, including Captain Clegg, The Wild Geese, The Sea Wolves, Puppet on a Chain,  and Who Dares Wins. He was also the lead actor in the Associated Rediffusion adventure series Crane (1963–65) and in the BBC-1 series Brett (1971). Allen played Moriarty's deputy Colonel Sebastian Moran in The Adventures of Sherlock Holmes and The Return of Sherlock Holmes.

He made regular appearances in ITC television series during the 1960s and early 1970s, including The Baron, The Champions, The Avengers, Gideon's Way and UFO ("Timelash" 1971), although he never had an ongoing role in any of these series. He made one episode of The Saint alongside Roger Moore in "The Man Who Could Not Die" broadcast July 1965 in the UK.

Allen also worked with the Royal Shakespeare Company in a number of stage roles, along with many BBC productions, notably appearing as Mr Gradgrind in a television production of Dickens' Hard Times in  1977.

In 1967 he and his wife Sarah Lawson appeared together playing a married couple in the science fiction film Night of the Big Heat. He and Lawson also played husband and wife in the BBC radio series Stand By For West based on the John Creasey novels about Scotland Yard Chief Inspector Roger West.

Allen's distinctive, authoritative voice was familiar across the United Kingdom, even amongst those who did not recognize him as an actor. He dubbed Leon Greene, who played Rex, in the 1968 Hammer film The Devil Rides Out.

He narrated the British Government's Protect and Survive series of public information films in the 1970s; some of his lines in that production were re-recorded and sampled into the single "Two Tribes" by the band Frankie Goes to Hollywood. He was also the voiceover artist for Vic and Bob's comedy series Vic Reeves Big Night Out, The Smell of Reeves and Mortimer and Shooting Stars, and appeared in and voiced numerous commercials for house builder Barratt Homes and car manufacturers Ford and British Leyland among many others. His voice-over work led him to start up his own business, running a very successful recording studio for voice-over work.

Allen's voice was heard at the beginning of videocassettes distributed in the UK by Video Network in the 1980s, welcoming viewers and reading an anti-copying warning. He also narrated the first series of Blackadder, and appeared in the last episode 'The Black Seal' as Edmund's nemesis, Phillip of Burgundy – known to his enemies as "The Hawk".

He provided the narration (the voice of Captain Star) for the 1989 children's series TUGS. Allen remained uncredited for his work, which was revealed in an interview with the show's producer Robert D. Cardona.

In 2005, he became the voice of the British television channel E4, providing voiceovers for many of its idents and promotions. That year, he did an altered re-recording of the Two Tribes version of the Protect and Survive narration for German cover band Welcome to the Pleasuredome, which is featured in their live performances.

He was also the voice of the Christian O'Connell Breakfast Show on XFM, the late show on 103.2 Power FM, Hirsty's Daily Dose on Galaxy Yorkshire and briefly Virgin Radio.

Personal life
Allen married actress Sarah Lawson in 1960, together the couple had two sons, Stephen and Stuart.

Death
Allen died on the morning of 28 July 2006 at age 79. He is survived by his wife and two sons.

Filmography

 Blackbeard the Pirate (1952) - Undetermined Role (uncredited)
 Battle Circus (1953) - British Officer (uncredited)
 World for Ransom (1954) - Soldier (uncredited)
 Dial M for Murder (1954) - Detective Pearson
 Confession (1955) - Corey
 Cross Channel (1955) - Hugo Platt
 King's Rhapsody (1955) - Richard's Companion in Theatre Box (uncredited)
 1984 (1956) - Inner Party Official
 Wicked as They Come (1956) - Willie
 The Baby and the Battleship (1956) - Mate (uncredited)
 High Tide at Noon (1957) - Charles MacKenzie
 The Long Haul (1957) - Joe Easy
 The Mark of the Hawk (1957) - Gregory
 High Hell (1958) - Luke Fulgham
 The Man Who Wouldn't Talk (1958) - Jim Kennedy
 Dunkirk (1958) - Sergeant on Parade Ground
 Tread Softly Stranger (1958) - Paddy Ryan
 I Was Monty's Double (1958) - Col. Mathers
 Jet Storm (1959) - Mulliner
 Never Take Sweets from a Stranger (1960) - Peter Carter
 The Sinister Man (1961) - Dr. Nelson Pollard
 The Traitors (1962) - John Lane
 Captain Clegg (1962) - Captain Collier
 Flight from Singapore (1962) - John Scott
 The Big Job (1965) - Narrator (voice, uncredited)
 The Night of the Generals (1967) - Colonel Mannheim
 The Viking Queen (1967) - Narrator (voice, uncredited)
 Night of the Big Heat (1967) - Jeff Callum
 Oedipus the King (1968) - Chorus Leader (voice, uncredited)
 The Devil Rides Out (1968) - Rex Van Ryn (voice, uncredited)
 Carry On Up the Khyber (1968) - Narrator (voice, uncredited)
 The Body Stealers (1969) - Bob Megan
 The Assassination Bureau (1969) - Narrator (voice, uncredited)
 The File of the Golden Goose (1969) - Narrator (voice, uncredited)
 When Dinosaurs Ruled the Earth (1970) - Kingsor / Narrator
 Puppet on a Chain (1971) - Inspector Van Gelder
 Persecution (1974) aka Sheba, The Graveyard, The Terror of Sheba - Robert Masters
 The Wilby Conspiracy (1975) - District Commissioner
 The Eagle Has Landed (1976) - Narrator (voice, uncredited)
 The Domino Principle (1977) - Narrator (voice, uncredited)
 The Wild Geese (1978) - Rushton
 Force 10 from Navarone (1978) - Narrator (voice, uncredited)
 Caligula (1979) - Macro (voice, uncredited)
 The Sea Wolves (1980) - Colin MacKenzie
 Who Dares Wins (1982) - Police Commissioner
 Bullet to Beijing (1995) - Col. Wilson
 Tugs (1989) - Captain Star/Narrator (voice, uncredited)
 RPM (1998) - Millionaire
 Dangerville (2003) - Unknown role (voice)
 Days That Shook the World (2004) - Sir John French
 The Magic Roundabout (2005) - Skeletons (voice, uncredited)

References

External links

 

1927 births
2006 deaths
English male film actors
English male stage actors
English male television actors
English male voice actors
McGill University alumni
Malawian emigrants to the United Kingdom
20th-century English businesspeople